Cute Knight is a casual life simulation role-playing video game with many possible endings and careers featuring a single female character. Gameplay is similar to the Japanese Princess Maker with a more traditionally Western first-person perspective dungeons.

Gameplay
Cute Knight is a life simulation/role-playing video game where the player takes the role of Michiko from 18 to 21. The game uses stats which determine how well she does in various tasks and her combat ability. In addition, her stats and key events determine the jobs she is able to do. The goal of the game is to unlock unlockable content and various endings, particularly good endings. The game ends after three years unless a special event ends the game sooner or Michiko's dream stat reaches 0; if the latter occurs the game still unlocks an ending, but it is always a bad ending based on her stats and key events triggered.

Tasks affect stats, generally positively.  Michiko's stats determine whether the task is completed successfully in a given day, with success often resulting in monetary gain. Each task takes one week of game time unless an annual event interferes with it. In addition, these annual events last for a varying number of days. During some of these events various mini-games can occur. Winning these mini-games may trigger key events or grant items, money, and/or stats boost. The game starts out with a few available tasks, but more open up by triggering key events and/or working at a particular place for some time. Several jobs can also be removed because of key events or high level of the sin stat.

Combat occurs inside a multi-level dungeon. Time passes as the player moves through the dungeon. The player can choose to either defeat the monster in combat or attempt to tame the monster, getting it to leave Michiko alone. If the player kills a living creature (as opposed to golems or undead), it increases Michiko's sin. Sin goes down if the player works at the church or the doctor's. Combat is turn-based and features magic point-based charms (spells).  These spells use nine elements, including the classical four. If Michiko's hit points (HP) drop to zero the player is automatically rescued. There is no character death, but she may need to pay to recover her lost health. Regardless, it will deplete the Dream meter during her recovery period and may lead  to the bad ending.

Characters
Michiko - The default name for the player character. She begins the game as an orphan and is looking for her real family. If the player seeks to find the true family, which is ending one, it is revealed that Michiko and Kirelan were switched at birth by Queen Penelope who wanted a baby boy but gave birth to Michiko instead. She pays a man to steal her a child and take her own away. This child is the son of the magic teacher Orchid. To find out the whole truth you have to win the wizard challenge, find princess Alexandra, win the May festival and discover your birthmark. Depending on whether you have high or low sin, and befriended Kiralan in the stables, you can end up being either: regent Queen, a mischief princess, or joint ruler with Kiralan.

The Royal Family:
Princess Alexandra - The kingdom's runaway princess, she bears a striking resemblance to the player character. She can be found picking through trash in the slums, and the player can choose to either help her return home or impersonate her.
Prince Kirelan - Raised as heir to the kingdom, he does not resemble either the king or the queen. He prefers the company of animals to life at court and spends a week at the church stables at the end of every month on the 23rd.
Queen Penelope - She judges the Flower Queen Festival each year at the end of March, and the player must win the contest in order to speak with her. She has concealed the truth about her first child for over eighteen years.
King Humphrey - He presides over the Tournament of Champions at each Midsummer Festival and shows no awareness of the various kidnappings and impersonations that plague his immediate family.
The Old Nursemaid - The servant who raised both Kirelan and Alexandra can be encountered at the library while reading to the children there. She provides crucial hints about the player character's true identity.

Teachers and employers:
Orchid - The magic teacher, she also presides over the Wizard's Challenge at the Midsummer Tournament. She has one daughter, Rose, and also an older son who was stolen from her as a baby. This baby is in fact prince Kirelan.
Shane - The fighting teacher, he sometimes spends his evenings drinking at the inn. This can be the beginning of romance for the player character if she is the one to drag him home.
Lisa - The green-haired librarian secretly yearns for adventure and romance. The player character can choose to provide her with both.
Darla - The dance teacher generally wins the Flower Queen contest each year, so hers is the score you must beat if you want to talk to Queen Penelope.
The Crafting teacher - This unnamed, reckless fellow is seeking items from the dungeon for a mysterious experiment. He's also Carmen's uncle.
Jareth - The leader of a gang of thieves in the slums, he is encountered only if the player character becomes so sinful that she is forbidden to return to town. Joining him is necessary in order to meet Princess Alexandra.
Others - No plotlines involve the Exercise or Kitchen Science teachers, the innkeeper, shopkeeper, or nun.

Girls:
Rose - The magic teacher's daughter, met at magic class.
Brittany - A blonde girl wearing a large bow, met in dance class, while working in the store or (if you two met at the store) after math class.
Carmen - A gossip, met socialising in the square.
Abby - A very competitive chef, met at cooking class or while working at the inn.

Development and release
Cute Knight was originally developed by Hanako Games and is based on the Princess Maker series. It was released online on December 31, 2005. It was later re-released on 2007 in an expanded version with updated features as Cute Knight Deluxe. This version was published by iWin and available at retail.

Reception
Erin Bell of GameZebo gives the game 4/5 stars, commenting positively that the game actually enables to "role-play" Michiko allowing the player to spend their time cooking or cleaning rather than forcing them into traditional role-playing games like Dragon Quest or Final Fantasy, making Cute Knight as a short-story version of such games. She opined that Cute Knight is a great casual game stating it "strips away a lot of...weightiness while remaining true to its RPG roots. The result is a light adventure that's easy to get into and can be played in short spurts - in other words, it's perfect for the casual gamer." While her comments are generally positive, she does comment on the graphics being mediocre, but complains more about the tasks which she comments can become repetitive wishing there was some kind of mini-game to break the monotony.

Cute Knight has been the recipient of multiple nominations and awards. It was a nominee for Yahoo! Games Most Innovative Casual Game of 2006. The original game has also been nominated and awarded from other sites as well.

Sequel
On November 13, 2009, a sequel Cute Knight Kingdom was officially released.

Notes

References

External links
Cute Knight page
IWin game page

2005 video games
Fantasy video games
Life simulation games
Linux games
MacOS games
Raising sims
Yuri (genre) video games
Single-player video games
Video games developed in the United Kingdom
Video games featuring female protagonists
Windows games